Ricou Ren Browning (February 16, 1930 – February 27, 2023) was an American film director, actor, producer, screenwriter, underwater cinematographer, and stuntman. He was best known for his underwater stunt work, especially in the 1954 film Creature from the Black Lagoon, in which he portrayed the titular Gill-man during the film's underwater scenes. Browning also co-created Flipper with Jack Cowden.

Early life
Ricou Ren Browning was born in Fort Pierce, Florida, on February 16, 1930. He majored in physical education at Florida State University.

Career

Browning started a career in water shows, moving on to produce shows. Browning worked at Wakulla Springs in the 1940s and learned to perform in underwater newsreels conceived by Newt Perry, who later took Browning along when he opened Weeki Wachee Springs.

While working at Wakulla Springs in 1953, Browning was asked to show around a film crew scouting for shooting locations. According to Browning, "Their cameraman asked if I could swim in front of the cameras so they could get the perspective of the size of a human being against the fish and the grass. So I did." Days later, the crew offered Browning the role of the titular Gill-man in the film Creature from the Black Lagoon (1954). Browning accepted, and played the Gill-man in the film's underwater scenes, while actor Ben Chapman played the monster on land. During filming, Browning reportedly held his breath underwater for up to four minutes at a time. Browning reprised his role as the underwater Gill-man in two sequels, Revenge of the Creature (1955) and The Creature Walks Among Us (1956).

Browning continued in movie production and joined Ivan Tors' studios in Florida, where with Jack Cowden he co-wrote and co-produced the 1963 film Flipper (about an intelligent bottlenose dolphin); Browning also directed the second unit underwater scenes for the film. Browning continued writing and directing for the subsequent Flipper television series that debuted in 1964.

He made his feature film directorial debut with Salty (1973), which he also co-wrote with Cowden, and directed the  cult film Mr. No Legs (1978).

He worked as second unit director, stunt coordinator and underwater sequence director on a number of features, including the James Bond films Thunderball (1965) and Never Say Never Again (1983), Around the World Under the Sea (1966), Island of the Lost (1967), Hello Down There (1969), and Caddyshack (1980).

A Florida native, Browning was inducted into the Florida Artists Hall of Fame in 2012. In 2019, he was inducted into the Rondo Hatton Classic Horror Awards' Monster Kid Hall of Fame.

Prior to his death, Browning was considered the last surviving original actor to portray any of the Universal Classic Monsters.

Personal life and death
Browning had two sons, Kelly Browning, Ricou Browning, Jr., who is also a marine coordinator, actor, and stuntman. He also had two daughters—Renee,  and Kim—along with 10 grandchildren and 11 great-grandchildren. His wife, Fran, died in March 2020.

Browning died at home in Southwest Ranches, Florida, on February 27, 2023, at age 93.

Selected filmography

Film

As actor/stuntman

As director/writer/stunt coordinator

Television

As actor/stuntman

As director

Notes

References

Bibliography

External links

 "Ricou Browning, Who Made the Black Lagoon Scary, Dies at 93", obituary in The New York Times
 
 
 
 

1930 births
2023 deaths
People from Fort Pierce, Florida
American male film actors
American cinematographers
American male screenwriters
American stunt performers
American underwater divers
Florida State University alumni
Film directors from Florida
American male television actors
Screenwriters from Florida
Film producers from Florida
Male actors from Florida